John Edward Atkinson was a British classicist. He was Emeritus Professor of Classics, as well as a former Dean of the Faculty of Arts, at the University of Cape Town.

Early life 

Atkinson studied at Durham University. He took a BA (Hons) in Classical and General Literature in 1961, where he was classmates with R. M. Errington.

Academic career 
Following his undergraduate studies he joined the University College of Rhodesia and Nyasaland (now University of Zimbabwe) as Assistant Lecturer. He moved to the University of South Africa a year later to take up a Lectureship in Ancient History. In 1965 he joined the University of Cape Town as Lecturer, completing a PhD at this institution in 1971. His first book, A commentary on Q. Curtius Rufus' Historiae Alexandri Magni Books 3 and 4, was published in 1980.

Atkinson's academic interests lay in the field of Ancient History, but he can, in the British tradition, be considered first and foremost as a Classicist. His particular area of specialization was the Latin historian, Q. Curtius Rufus. Joseph Roisman, in the Oxford Bibliographies entry on Alexander the Great, has labelled Atkinson as the 'leading commentator on Curtius'. Jacek Rzepka, in a Bryn Mawr Classical Review article on Atkinson's work, described him as 'a scholar who has almost monopolized studies in Curtius Rufus for two decades'.

Atkinson was an active member of the Classical Association of Rhodesia and Nyasaland (1961–63), as well as Assistant Editor of the Proceedings of the African Classical Association (PACA), and the Classical Association of South Africa (CASA), where he was elected onto the Executive Committee as Treasurer (1981–83), Vice-Chairperson (1999–2001) and as Chairperson (2001–03). He was an Honorary President of the Association. He has served as a member of the editorial boards of both Acta Classica (1985–2003) and of Akroterion (1985–2022).

Personal
Atkinson died after a short illness on 11 April 2022 in Cape Town.

Further reading
Wardle, David. "John Edward Atkinson: An Appreciation", Acta Classica 48 (2005). Retrieved on 28 September 2018.

References

1938 births
Living people
Academic staff of the University of Cape Town
Alumni of Hatfield College, Durham
University of Cape Town alumni
Academic staff of the University of Zimbabwe
Academic staff of the University of South Africa
South African classical scholars